Shavkat is an Uzbek masculine given name, a variation of Perso-Arabic name Shawkat. It may refer to
Shavkat Mirziyoyev (born 1957), President of Uzbekistan 
Shavkat Mullajanov (born 1986), Uzbekistani football player
Shavkat Raimqulov (born 1984), Uzbekistani football player
Shavkat Salomov (born 1985), Uzbekistani football striker
 Shavkat Rakhmonov (born 1994), Kazakhstani mixed martial artist

See also
Shawkat